Pukara Mayu (Aymara and Quechua pukara  fortress or mountain of protection, mayu river, Hispanicized spelling Pucara Mayu) is a Bolivian river in the Cochabamba Department, Chapare Province, Sacaba Municipality. It is a left affluent of Mayllanku River (Maylanco) which receives the name Rocha River when it enters the Cochabamba Municipality.

See also
List of rivers of Bolivia

References

Rivers of Cochabamba Department